The 1978 Air Force Falcons football team represented the United States Air Force Academy in the 1978 NCAA Division I-A football season as an independent. Future National Football League (NFL) head coach Bill Parcells replaced Ben Martin as head coach in his only season as Air Force head coach. The Falcons played their home games at Falcon Stadium in Colorado Springs, Colorado. They finished the season with a record of 3–8.

Schedule

Personnel

References

Air Force
Air Force Falcons football seasons
Air Force Falcons football